The 2013 Georgia State Panthers baseball team represented Georgia State University in the 2013 NCAA Division I baseball season.  The Panthers played their home games at the GSU Baseball Complex. The 2013 season represented Georgia States final season in the Colonial Athletic Association before leaving to join the Sun Belt Conference. Because of their planned move, the CAA would not allow Georgia State to compete in the end of season tournament.

Personnel

2013 Roster

Baseball - 2013 Roster

Coaching Staff

Schedule

! style="background:#0000FF;color:white;"| Regular Season
|- valign="top" 

|- bgcolor="#ccffcc"
| 1 || February 15 ||  || GSU Baseball Complex || 12-7 || 1-0 || -
|- bgcolor="#ccffcc"
| 2 || February 16 || Butler || GSU Baseball Complex || 17-9 || 2-0 || -
|- align="center" bgcolor="#ffccc"
| 3 || February 17 || Butler || GSU Baseball Complex || 10-8 || 2-1 || -
|- align="center" bgcolor="#ffccc"
| 4 || February 19 ||  || Russ Chandler Stadium || 5-16 || 2-2 || -
|- bgcolor="#ccffcc"
| 5 || February 20 ||   || GSU Baseball Complex || 20-0 || 3-2 || -
|- bgcolor="#ccffcc"
| 6 || February 22 ||  || GSU Baseball Complex || 8-7 || 4-2 || -
|- align="center" bgcolor="#ffccc"
| 7 || February 23 || Grambling State || GSU Baseball Complex || 4-9 || 4-3 || -
|- align="center" bgcolor="#ffccc"
| 8 || February 24 || Grambling State || GSU Baseball Complex || 7-17 || 4-4 || -
|- bgcolor="#ccffcc"
| 9 || February 26 ||  || GSU Baseball Complex || 10-7 || 5-4 || -
|-

|- bgcolor="#ccffcc"
| 10 || March 1 ||  || St. Petersburg, FL || 5-4 || 6-4 || -
|- align="center" bgcolor="#ffccc"
| 11 || March 2 || Boston College || St. Petersburg, FL || 0-2 || 6-5 || -
|- bgcolor="#ccffcc"
| 12 || March 3 || Boston College || St. Petersburg, FL || 7-6 || 7-5 || -
|- bgcolor="#ccffcc"
| 13 || March 5 ||  || GSU Baseball Complex || 12-3 || 8-5 || -
|- bgcolor="#ccffcc"
| 14 || March 6 ||  UNC Asheville || GSU Baseball Complex || 13-5 || 9-5 || -
|- align="center" bgcolor="#ffccc"
| 15 || March 8 ||  || GSU Baseball Complex || 13-14 || 9-6 || 0-1
|- bgcolor="#ccffcc"
| 16 || March 9 || George Mason || GSU Baseball Complex || 12-3 || 10-6 || 1-1
|- bgcolor="#ccffcc"
| 17 || March 10 || George Mason || GSU Baseball Complex || 8-7 || 11-6 || 2-1
|- bgcolor="#ffffff"
| - || March 13 ||  || Fred Stillwell Stadium || cancelled || - || -
|- bgcolor="#ccffcc"
| 18 || March 15 ||  Old Dominion || GSU Baseball Complex || 13-8 || 12-6 || 3-1
|- bgcolor="#ccffcc"
| 19 || March 16 || Old Dominion || GSU Baseball Complex || 12-10 || 13-6 || 4-1
|- bgcolor="#ccffcc"
| 20 || March 17 || Old Dominion || GSU Baseball Complex || 7-4 || 14-6 || 5-1
|- align="center" bgcolor="#ffccc"
| 21 || March 19 ||  || GSU Baseball Complex || 4-9 || 14-7 || 5-1
|- bgcolor="#ccffcc"
| 22 || March 20 ||  Mercer || Claude Smith Field || 13-7 || 15-7 || 5-1
|- align="center" bgcolor="#ffccc"
| 23 || March 22 ||  || Brooks Field || 0-9 || 15-8 || 5-2
|- align="center" bgcolor="#ffccc"
| 24 || March 23 || UNC Wilmington || Brooks Field || 1-12 || 15-9 || 5-3
|- align="center" bgcolor="#ffccc"
| 25 || March 24 || UNC Wilmington || Brooks Field || 11-12 || 15-10 || 5-4
|- bgcolor="#ccffcc"
| 26 || March 27 ||  || GSU Baseball Complex || 14-1 || 16-10 || 5-4
|- align="center" bgcolor="#ffccc"
| 27 || March 29 ||  || Bob Hannah Stadium || 2-7 || 16-11 || 5-5
|- align="center" bgcolor="#ffccc"
| 28 || March 30 || Delaware || Bob Hannah Stadium || 7-8 (10) || 16-12 || 5-6
|- align="center" bgcolor="#ffccc"
| 29 || March 30 || Delaware || Bob Hannah Stadium || 2-4 || 16-13 || 5-7
|-

|- bgcolor="#ffffff"
| - || April 3 ||  Alabama State || Wheeler–Watkins Baseball Complex || Cancelled || - || -
|- bgcolor="#ccffcc"
| 30 || April 5 ||  || GSU Baseball Complex || 12-9 || 17-13 || 5-7
|- bgcolor="#ccffcc"
| 31 || April 6 || Fordham || GSU Baseball Complex || 9-3 || 18-13 || 5-7
|- bgcolor="#ccffcc"
| 32 || April 6 || Fordham || GSU Baseball Complex || 5-3 || 19-13 || 5-7
|- bgcolor="#ccffcc"
| 33 || April 7 || Fordham || GSU Baseball Complex || 5-2 || 20-13 || 5-7
|- bgcolor="#ccffcc"
| 34 || April 9 || Kennesaw State || GSU Baseball Complex || 12-5 || 21-13 || 5-7
|- bgcolor="#ccffcc"
| 35 || April 12 || New Orleans || Maestri Field || 4-3 || 22-13 || 5-7
|- bgcolor="#ccffcc"
| 36 || April 13 || New Orleans || Maestri Field || 5-4 || 23-13 || 5-7
|- bgcolor="#ccffcc"
| 37 || April 13 || New Orleans || Maestri Field || 6-5 || 24-13 || 5-7
|- align="center" bgcolor="#ffccc"
| 38 || April 14 || New Orleans || Maestri Field || 2-3 || 24-14 || 5-7
|- bgcolor="#ccffcc"
| 39 || April 16 || Kennesaw State || Fred Stillwell Stadium || 3-2 || 25-14|| 5-7
|- bgcolor="#ccffcc"
| 40 || April 19 ||  || Eagle Field at Veterans Memorial Park || 14-12 || 26-14 || 6-7
|- align="center" bgcolor="#ffccc"
| 40 || April 20 || James Madison || Eagle Field at Veterans Memorial Park || 8-9 || 26-15 || 6-8
|- align="center" bgcolor="#ffccc"
| 41 || April 21 || James Madison || Eagle Field at Veterans Memorial Park || 5-8 || 26-16 || 6-9
|- bgcolor="#ccffcc"
| 42 || April 23 ||  || GSU Baseball Complex || 11-2 || 27-16 || 6-9
|- align="center" bgcolor="#ffccc"
| 43 || April 26 ||  || Parsons Field || 5-6 || 27-17 || 6-10
|- bgcolor="#ccffcc"
| 44 || April 27 ||  Northeastern || Parsons Field || 6-0 || 28-17 || 7-10
|- bgcolor="#ccffcc"
| 45 || April 28 ||  Northeastern || Parsons Field || 2-1 || 29-17 || 8-10
|-

|- bgcolor="#ccffcc"
| 46 || May 3 ||  || GSU Baseball Complex || 12-11 || 30-17 || 9-10
|- bgcolor="#ccffcc"
| 47 || May 4 || Towson ||  GSU Baseball Complex || 6-4 || 31-17 || 10-10
|- bgcolor="#ccffcc"
| 48 || May 5 ||  Towson ||  GSU Baseball Complex|| 8-3 || 32-17 || 11-10
|- align="center" bgcolor="#ffccc"
| 49 || May 8 ||  Kennesaw State ||  GSU Baseball Complex || 6-5 || 32-18 || 11-10
|- bgcolor="#ccffcc"
| 50 || May 10 ||  || GSU Baseball Complex || 10-3 || 33-18 || 12-10
|- align="center" bgcolor="#ffccc"
| 51 || May 11 ||  Hofstra ||  GSU Baseball Complex || 9-12 || 33-19 || 12-11
|- bgcolor="#ccffcc"
| 52 || May 12 ||  Hofstra || GSU Baseball Complex || 6-3 || 34-19 || 13-11
|- align="center" bgcolor="#ffccc"
| 53 || May 16 ||  || Williamsburg, VA || 3-15 || 34-20 || 13-12
|- bgcolor="#ccffcc"
| 54 || May 17 ||  William and Mary || Williamsburg, VA || 12-4 || 35-20 || 14-12
|- align="center" bgcolor="#ffccc"
| 55 || May 17 || William and Mary || Williamsburg, VA || 0-14 || 35-21 || 14-13
|-

|-
|

References

Georgia State
Georgia State Panthers baseball seasons